Harold Rosenbaum (born January 24, 1950) is an American conductor and musician.  He is the artistic director and conductor of the New York Virtuoso Singers and the Canticum Novum Singers.  The New York Virtuoso Singers appear on 48 albums on labels including Naxos Records and Sony Classical.  He has collaborated extensively with many ensembles including the New York Philharmonic, Juilliard Orchestra, American Symphony Orchestra, Bang on a Can, Mark Morris Dance Group, Orchestra of Saint Luke's, Glyndebourne Festival Opera, Riverside Symphony, and Brooklyn Philharmonic.

Biography
Harold Rosenbaum was born in 1950 in Danville, Pennsylvania.  In 1951, his family moved to the Bronx, and then to Flushing, Queens. He began studying piano and singing in choirs at an early age. In addition to his musical talents, he had a childhood love of drawing that briefly saw him consider a career in architecture.
He was especially inspired by The Lion Hunt by Peter Paul Rubens, a famous Baroque painting he meticulously copied by hand.
He attended Flushing High School, graduating in 1967.  In the summer before his senior year, he decided to pursue music when he was one of sixteen young singers selected for an intensive summer choral program.  Until university, his musical tendencies were towards pop and folk music inspired by famous folk trio Peter, Paul and Mary and iconic film singer Mario Lanza.

In 1967 he began attending Queens College where he developed a passion for choral music, both classical and contemporary, and was mentored by faculty members Joel Mandelbaum, Saul Novak, Paul Maynard, and others. In 1972 he graduated with a BA in vocal performance.  He continued his graduate studies at Queens, earning an MA in choral conducting in 1974 and an honorary doctorate in 2011.

Career
In 1973, as a graduate student at Queens College, he established his first choir, The Canticum Novum Singers, a volunteer ensemble which quickly established a significant presence in the New York City music scene.  The reputation and skill of the group has led to numerous tours and choral premieres of works by composers such as Johann Christian Bach, George Benjamin, Luciano Berio, Anton Bruckner, Gabriel Fauré, John Harbison, George Frideric Handel, Ned Rorem, Peter Schickele, and Alfred Schnittke.

In 1988, building on the successes of CNS, he founded a professional choir, The New York Virtuoso Singers, which was developed from an existing group of professional singers which performed for the Brooklyn Philharmonic, where he was choirmaster. In 1993, the young group was invited to be the first-ever guest chorus at the Tanglewood Festival of Contemporary Music, returning in 2013. Rosenbaum has led NYVS in over 100 concerts, including a tour of Scandinavia. NYVS has premiered over 500 new works by notable contemporary composers, including Luciano Berio, John Harbison, Hans Werner Henze, Louis Andriessen, Shulamit Ran, George Perle, Ernst Krenek, Thea Musgrave, Jonathan Harvey, Arvo Pärt, and Andrew Imbrie.

Rosenbaum is also an active educator.  He has taught at Queens College, Adelphi University, The Juilliard School and the University at Buffalo, where he led the graduate program in choral conducting and directed two vocal ensembles, UB Choir and UB Chorus.

Throughout his career, Rosenbaum has been a patron of aspiring and accomplished American composers, commissioning well over 100 new compositions and bringing obscure works into the public eye. To that end, he founded a recording company, Virtuoso Choral Recordings, to disseminate contemporary American choral works.

Though his primary focuses are NYVS and CNS, he has many other pursuits.  He edits two series of choral music for G. Schirmer Inc. and Peermusic Classical.

From 2010 to 2013 he was the artistic director of the Society for Universal Sacred Music, which sponsored a music festival in NYC.

In 2014 he created The Harold Rosenbaum Choral Conducting Institute which sponsors annual multi-day workshops in sites such as Columbia University, Wesleyan University, New York University, Adelphi University, Brandeis University, The University at Utah, and the University at Buffalo.

In 2015 he created "ChoralFest USA – A Celebration of the Diversity of Choral Music in America", an annual marathon concert in NYC designed to showcase talented choral ensembles.

His New York Virtuoso Singers also appeared on the Late Show with David Letterman on Millennium New Year's Eve, performing the finale of Beethoven's 9th Symphony with the Brooklyn Philharmonic.

He has taken choirs on 29 trips to Europe, including participation in the Ludlow Festival, the Siracusa Festival, and the Cheltenham Fringe Festival.

He also participates in the Bach in the Subways classical music awareness campaign, conducting Bach in public spaces.

Collaborations

Over the years, Rosenbaum has worked extensively with an eclectic group of major artists, among them Robert Spano, David Lang, David Del Tredici, Stephen Schwartz, Charles Wuorinen, Sir Charles Mackerras, Lukas Foss, Thea Musgrave, John Corigliano, Shulamit Ran, Julia Wolfe, James Conlon, Dennis Russell Davies, Leon Botstein, Michael York, Sir Jonathan Miller, Elliott Carter, and Milton Babbitt.

He has performed on concerts with Bang on a Can, Glyndebourne Festival Opera, New York Philharmonic, Juilliard Orchestra, American Symphony Orchestra, Riverside Symphony, Chamber Music Society of Lincoln Center, Tony Bennett, Leonard Slatkin, Marianne Faithfull, James Galway, Licia Albanese, Concerto Köln, Bard Festival Orchestra, American Composers Orchestra, Da Capo Chamber Players, S.E.M. Ensemble, Continuum, Paul Taylor Dance Company, New York Youth Symphony, and the Brooklyn Philharmonic (59 times) and many others.

In 2007 Rosenbaum collaborated with Ennio Morricone and the Orchestra Roma Sinfonietta in concerts performed at the United Nations Headquarters and Radio City Music Hall

In 2012 he conducted Haydn's 'The Creation' in Carnegie Hall with the Orchestra of Saint Luke's.

In 2016, Rosenbaum conducted Roberto Sierra's Missa Latina in a new arrangement he commissioned for choir, soloists, 24 percussion instruments and two pianos.

Selected awards
2014 Columbia University Ditson Conductor's Award
2014 ASCAP/Chorus America Adventuresome Programming Award
2010 ASCAP Victor Herbert Award
2008 American Composers Alliance Laurel Leaf Award

Selected discography

Personal life
He resides in Westchester County, New York with his wife Edie.  He has two daughters and three grandsons

References

1950 births
20th-century classical musicians
20th-century American conductors (music)
21st-century classical musicians
21st-century American conductors (music)
American classical musicians
American choral conductors
American male conductors (music)
Living people
Pupils of George Perle
20th-century American male musicians
21st-century American male musicians
University at Buffalo faculty